The cars in Miami Vice mainly involve the Ferrari Daytona Spyder and the Ferrari Testarossa, but also include other automobiles driven by the characters on the show. Currently one Daytona (Car #4) is in a private collection and the other (Car #1) is on display at the Volo Auto Museum; the Ferrari Testarossa stunt car resides in Kingsport, Tennessee and is owned by Carl Roberts of Carl Roberts Motor Group. Today, one of the hero cars (Ferrari Testarossa chassis #63631) is part of The Witvoet collection owned by Bastiaan Witvoet in Belgium.

Daytona Spyder

During the first two seasons and two episodes from the third season, Detective Sonny Crockett drove a black 1972 Ferrari Daytona Spyder 365 GTS/4 replica with a Florida license plate ZAQ178. Ferrari North America had turned down the request by Miami Vice for authentic Ferraris (they did the same with Magnum, P.I., forcing that production to purchase 308 GTSs). Although Tom McBurnie is credited with planting the Daytona Spyder in the mind of the public, it was actually Al Mardekian, an importer of gray-market exoticars, who sold Miami Vice the two look-alike Ferraris for $49,000 each. In total two Corvette Daytona replicas were used for the show, car 4 and then car 1 after the pilot which acted as the stunt car. McBurnie was hired to build the bodies for the Corvette-chassised cars. It was blown to pieces on the show with a hand-held Stinger missile launcher during an illegal arms deal.

The "Ferraris" used in the first two seasons were actually re-bodied Corvettes based on a 1976 Corvette (car 1) and a 1981 (car 4) Chevrolet Corvette C3 chassis that had been modified with fiberglass body panels by specialty car manufacturer McBurnie Coachcraft to resemble an early-1970s Ferrari Daytona Spyder. the tan and black leather interior as well as the convertible top was fabricated by Scott Draizin/Headsup industries based in Ft Lauderdale.  
Still, the very first scene in the pilot episode which has the black Daytona appearing, though for a few seconds, makes use of a real Ferrari Daytona owned by Dr. Roger Sherman of Coconut Grove, Florida. It can be clearly identified as a real Daytona (American version) by the door handles, side markers, windshield rake, sun visors, width variation and side vent windows.  All moving close-up scenes were done on the back of a flatbed truck under the supervision of TIDE Ferrari Racing crew member / model Kimberly Denson of Ft. Lauderdale, Fl.

Testarossa

Ferrari filed a lawsuit demanding McBurnie and four others to stop producing and selling Ferrari replicas. Miami Vice producers, on the other hand, wanted no legal troubles, and accepted Ferrari's offer of two free 1986 Testarossas on the condition that the replicas be destroyed. Carl Roberts offered to build two new Daytonas for the 1987 season (third season of Miami Vice). When Roberts learned that the Daytona was out, he proposed a trade: he would build Miami Vice a Testarossa stunt car in return for the doomed Daytona. Carl's original plan was to remove the Daytona skin from the Corvette and replace it with Testarossa body pieces, but this yielded poor results and led Roberts to devise another plan.

Roberts searched and found a 1972 De Tomaso Pantera, which was perfectly suited for the Testarossa body pieces. The Pantera was rigidly modified to withstand the duties of filming: it was raised 1.5 inches for additional ground clearance, 2.5 inch wall-thick square tubing was used to prevent potential roof buckling and added a reinforcing railing that doubles as a skid plate. An auxiliary braking system was designed to assist drivers in controlled spins: the master cylinder was repositioned in the brake line to enable it to feed the rear wheels, enabling the driver to lock the aft end on command, and the auxiliary master cylinder utilizes the original master cylinder's reservoir and is installed in series with the outlet of the original master cylinder port leading to the rear wheels. When the stock brake is applied, fluid passes freely through the stunt master cylinder inlet port and compensating port and out the exhaust port to the rear wheels. When the stunt brake is applied, the piston in the master cylinder blocks off the compensating port to the exhaust port and pressurizes the rear brake system, cutting off the original brake master cylinder besides the compensating port in the stunt brake. BF Goodrich TA's were added for enhanced traction, as were Tilton brake calipers. The improved traction required installation of a hydraulic in-line brake power booster lifted from a Volvo P-1800. It operates on engine vacuum to aid in breaking loose the pavement-hugging TA's. To further enhance the growl of the vehicle, Robert's team installed a NOS port-injected nitrous system, which was later replaced with a plate-type configuration. He also replaced the stock carburetor with a Predator unit which reduces fuel lag. A Modine all-aluminum four-core radiator was used to guard against Miami's hot weather, and liquid Auto-Meter gauges to monitor the temperature.

In the second episode of the third season, Crockett complained to Lt. Castillo about driving vehicles that did not fit his cover as a high-roller drug dealer, that he was going around "looking like Li'l Abner"; Castillo quietly replied "It's out back." Sonny was then delighted to find his new white 1986 Ferrari Testarossa, Florida license plate AIF00M. The original Testarossas donated by Ferrari North America were black metallic but were then painted white. The Testarossa briefly appears in black in the season 3 episode "El Viejo", which was originally intended to be the season opener, but was then switched with "When Irish Eyes Are Crying" because it was thought that the season needed to start with a "bang" (i.e. the fake Daytona being blown up). Different reasons were given at the time as to why the cars were repainted in white, ranging from a driving mishap by Don Johnson on the set that resulted in one of the cars requiring a new coat of paint, to Michael Mann thinking that, unlike the Daytona, the black exterior paint did not make the Testarossa look good enough in night scenes.
One of the two main Testarossas used in filming recently resided on display at The Fort Lauderdale Swap Shop. The Swap Shop's owner purchased the car from NBC for $750,000 and has reportedly turned down $1,000,000 offers for it. The other White Ferrari Testarossa was owned by Peter Lima, of Real Muscle Car Boutique also located in Miami, Florida and was put up for auction for $1.75 million through eBay in December 2014, after gaining a lot of buzz from the media.  Today, the hero car (Ferrari Testarossa chassis #63631) is documented by Ferrari Classiche and is part of a collection currently owned by Adams Classic & Collector Cars in Buford, GA.

Other characters
Ricardo Tubbs drove a 1964 Cadillac Coupe de Ville Convertible. and a 1982 Pontiac Firebird Trans Am in the pilot episode. 

Stan Switek drove a turquoise 1961 Ford Thunderbird. Gina Calabrese drove a 1971 Mercury Cougar XR-7 convertible. When Stan and Larry were undercover, they drove a Dodge Ram Van. Crockett's ex-wife drove a 1983 Ford LTD Country Squire.

Notable cars
Other notable vehicles that appeared in Miami Vice (other than a Ferrari), that were driven by villains, police officers, and other characters on the show included, brands such as Lamborghini, AMG Mercedes-Benz, BMW, Maserati, Lotus, DeLorean, Porsche, and Corvettes. American muscle cars, such as the GTO, Trans Am, Mustang, Chevrolet Camaro, and a Plymouth Barracuda also made appearances.

Season 1
1981 Buick Electra Park Avenue 
1983 Cadillac Eldorado
1975 Chevrolet Monza Towne
1981 Chevrolet Monte Carlo
1982 Chevrolet Camaro
Ford C-Series
1973 GMC C-Series
1981 Mercedes-Benz S-Klasse Stretched Limousine
1982 Plymouth Gran Fury
1976 Pontiac LeMans
1983 BMW 633 CSi
1980 Cadillac DeVille Stretched Limousine
1974 Chevrolet Corvette Stingray
1982 Pontiac Firebird Trans Am
Rolls-Royce Phantom V
Rolls-Royce Silver Cloud III
1959 Rolls-Royce Silver Cloud II
1975 Toyota Corona Hardtop 
1980 Volkswagen Rabbit Convertible I (Type 17)
1980 Rapid Transit Series
1977 Buick Electra 225
1980 Cadillac Sedan DeVille Stretched Limousine
1981 Chevrolet Malibu
1979 Chevrolet Camaro Z28
1983 Ford LTD
1984 Ford Mustang
1984 Lincoln Town Car
1980 Mercury Zephyr
1979 AMC Spirit
1973 Chevrolet C-60
1973 Chevrolet Nova
1975 Chevrolet Chevy Van
1976 Chevrolet Monte Carlo
1981 Datsun 210
1974 Dodge Sportsman 
1982 Dodge Ram Wagon
1984 Dodge Omni
Fiat-Allis 11 B 
1962 Ford Thunderbird
1965 Ford Mustang
1969 Pontiac LeMans
1975 Toyota Corolla Wagon
1980 Toyota Corolla Tercel
1984 Buick Regal
1984 Cadillac Fleetwood
1983 Chevrolet Camaro
Mercedes-Benz 500 SEL
1968 Pontiac GTO
Mercedes-Benz 500 SEC
1975 Checker Marathon
1980 Maserati Quattroporte III
1981 DMC DeLorean
1955 Ford F-100
1983 Maserati Biturbo
1937 Packard
1969 Rolls-Royce Silver Shadow I
1968 Chevrolet Corvette
1975 Fiat 124 Spider
1956 Ford Thunderbird
1972 Mercedes-Benz 350 SLC
Lamborghini Countach S
Mercedez-Benz 600 Pullman
1976 Mercedes-Benz 450 SEL 6.9
1974 Checker Marathon
1967 Ford Mustang
1963 MG B
1978 Ford Thunderbird
1970 Dodge Challenger R/T
1961 Ford Thunderbird
Porsche Kremer Racing 935 Gr.5 Street
1983 Renault Alliance
1969 Chevrolet Camaro RS
1981 Chevrolet Corvette
1971 Mercedes-Benz 350 SL
1980 Mercedes-Benz
1985 Pontiac Grand Am
1983 BMW 733i
1978 Cadillac Fleetwood 75 Limousine
1977 Pontiac Firebird Trans Am
1972 International Harvester Loadstar 1700
1979 Lincoln Continental
1971 Plymouth Satellite
1975 Plymouth Fury

Season 2
Rolls-Royce Camargue
1972 AMC Jeep CJ-5
1958 Cadillac Eldorado Biarritz
1980 Checker Marathon
1941 Dodge WC 41
1944 Dodge WC 51
1981 Mercedes-Benz S-Klasse Stretched Limousine
1978 Porsche 928
1974 Rolls-Royce Silver Shadow I
Rolls-Royce Silver Spur
1941 Willys MB 'Jeep'
1969 Cadillac Fleetwood 75 Limousine
1957 Chevrolet 3100
1976 Ferrari 308 GTBi
1961 Ford Thunderbird
1983 Porsche 911 SC Cabrio
1954 Reo Comet
1981 Lamborghini Jalpa
1985 Pontiac Firebird Trans Am Autoform 
1978 Chevrolet Corvette
Mercedes-Benz SL
Nova Sterling
1984 Chevrolet Corvette
1973 Ford Mustang
1984 Chevrolet Corvette
1985 Ford Mustang
1948 GMC 300
1958 Lincoln Premiere
1978 Mercedes-Benz 280 CE
1981 Peugeot 505
1955 Studebaker Commander Regal
1985 Lincoln Town Car Stretched Limousine
1985 Lamborghini Countach 5000 Quattrovalvole
Lamborghini Countach 5000 S
1974 Mercedes-Benz S-Klasse Stretched Limousine
1975 MG B GT
Porsche 911 Turbo
Reo Gold Comet
1984 Chevrolet Corvette
Chevrolet Corvette GTP (Lola T711)
1980 Maserati Quattroporte III
1984 Pontiac Firebird Trans Am
1973 Porsche 911 Targa
1969 BMW 3.0 CSi
1969 Chevrolet Corvette Stingray
1984 Nissan 300ZX
AC Shelby Cobra
Ferrari 365 GTS/4
Argo JM16
Argo JM19
Aston Martin Nimrod NRA/C2
1984 Chevrolet Corvette
1986 Ford Mustang Probe
Honda ATC 200S
Jaguar XJR-5 (Fabcar)
1984 Kawasaki 600 R Ninja
Lola T600
Lola T616
March 82G
March 84G
March 85G
1983 Maserati Biturbo
1981 Mazda RX-7
Nissan GTP ZX-Turbo
1985 Pontiac Firebird
Porsche 906
Porsche 962
1957 Ford Thunderbird
1984 Lincoln Town Car Stretched Limousine
Mercedes-Benz SL
Jeep CJ
1979 Mercedes-Benz 300 TD

Season 3
Checker Taxicab
1986 Ferrari Testarossa
Jeep CJ
Mazda RX-7
1975 MG Midget
1971 Opel Manta
Chevrolet Apache
 M151 jeep
Aston Martin V8 Volante
1983 Cadillac Fleetwood 75 Limousine
1985 Cadillac Professional Coach
1983 Ford Thunderbird
1985 Ford Mustang
1984 Nissan 200SX
Porsche 944
Chevrolet Camaro
1955 Chevrolet Two-Ten Delray
1970 Ford Torino GT
1977 Ford Thunderbird
Lincoln Town Car Stretched Limousine
Pontiac GTO
1974 Mercedes-Benz 280
Lotus Esprit Turbo
Peugeot 505
1974 BMW 2002
1954 Ford Crestline Victoria
1957 Mercedes-Benz 300d
Plymouth Barracuda
1982 Cadillac Fleetwood Brougham Stretched Limousine
Mercedes-Benz 560 SEL
1976 Pontiac Grand Prix
Renault LeCar
Zimmer Golden Spirit

Season 4
1974 Mercedes-Benz 450 SEL
1984 Lamborghini Jalpa
1981 or 1982 DeLorean

Season 5
Lamborghini LM-002
1982 Aston Martin Lagonda Stretched Limousine MkII
1971 Mustang convertible M code. Episode 93. Current owner purchased the vehicle in 1989. It was fully restored and painted red from blue. Current owner is Calixto Castells.
1987 Buick Grand National. Episode 16

References

Miami Vice